is a former Japanese radio personality, narrator and tarento. He is represented with Sunday.

Sean K's career as a Japanese news and business commentator abruptly ended in 2016 after weekly magazine Shukan Bunshun exposed his fabricated academic background including claims of an MBA from Harvard Business School.

Filmography

Radio

Television programmes

Advertisements

Bibliography

References

External links
Nihon Tarento Meikan profile – 
Kotobank – Talent Databank / Kotobank 
 DJ profile 
 
 – OK Wave 

Japanese television personalities
Japanese television presenters
Japanese radio personalities
Impostors
1968 births
Living people